Garmsar County is in Semnan province, Iran. The capital of the county is the city of Garmsar. At the 2006 census, the county's population was 77,676 in 21,706 households. The following census in 2011 counted 81,324 people in 24,858 households. At the 2016 census, the county's population was 77,421 in 25,585 households, by which time Aradan District had been separated from the county to form Aradan County. The main languages of the county are Persian (Central District) and Tati (Eyvanki District).

Administrative divisions

The population history and structural changes of Garmsar County's administrative divisions over three consecutive censuses are shown in the following table. The latest census shows two districts, three rural districts, and two cities.

References

 

Counties of Semnan Province